Chauddagram is an upazila of Cumilla District in the Division of Chittagong, Bangladesh. It also a Municipality under Cumilla District.

History
This  Chauddagram  area was very dear to md osman bhuiyan of kaichuty alkara chauddagram. From this region, a lot of revenue was collected in the king's treasury. The generous king also did a lot of good deeds in this area. The large reservoirs and dig of Chauddagram bear their identity. At that time, different geographicaregionsas were called Parganas for the purpose of rent collection Upazila was also a pargana headquarters at Chauddagram. As this pargana was established with fourteen villages, it was named Chauddagram. Later, when the thana was established in 1905, the whole thana was renamed Chauddagram after the name of the center.

Language and Culture
The geo-nature and geographical location of the Chauddagram Upazila have played a role in shaping the language and culture of the people of this Upazila. located in the south-eastern part of Bangladesh, this Upazila is surrounded by the Indian state of Tripura, Dhaka division, and other Upazilas of the Chittagong division. here the main characteristics of the language are the same as in other Upazilas of Bangladesh, yet some diversity can be found. for example, in the spoken language, the sound of great life is largely absent, that is, there is a tendency to simplify the language. the regional language of Chauddagram Upazila is very similar to the language of the dhaka region, the regional language of Lakhsam Upazila is very similar to the language of the Noakhali area. experts believe that Chauddagram has had a huge impact on the language culture of Upazila. the civilization of Chauddagram Upazila is very old. the archaeological artifacts found in this area and the ruins of the Buddhist vihara are known to be the bearers of ancient civilizations.

Geography
Chauddagram is South East of Dhaka. It is on the Southern part of Comilla. Surrounded by Sadar Dakshin, Tripura, Laksham, and Feni.

Administration
Chauddagram Upazila is divided into Chauddagram Municipality and 13 union parishads: Alkara, Batisha, Cheora, Ghulpasha, Gunabati, Jagannatdighi, Kalikapur, Kankapait, Kashinagar, Moonshirhat, Shuvapur, Sreepur, and Ujirpur. The union parishads are subdivided into 363 mauzas and 403 villages.

Chauddagram Municipality is subdivided into 9 wards and 27 mahallas.

Demographics 

At the time of the 2011 census, Chauddagram Upazila had a population of 443,648 living in 87,475 households. Chauddagram Upazila had a population growth rate of 16.28% over the decade 2001-2011. It had a literacy rate of 56.9% and a sex ratio of 1131 females to 1000 males. 8.64% of the population lives in urban areas.

Education
Schools:

 Chauddagram H. J. Govt. Pilot Model High School (1921)
 Chouddagram Secondary Pilot Girls High School
 Kankapait School (Founder - Munshi Muhammad Ibrahim)
 Cheora B.F High School
 Bijoykara School and College est- School -1970 and College - 1992 (Founder - Aga MD Aminul Islam Chowdhury)
 Batisa Secondary School, founded in 1926 Munsirhat High School (1954)
 Khironshal Kazi Jafar Ahmed High School 
 Payer Khola High School (1882)
 Gunabati M/L High School, Tarashail High School
 Munshirhat High School
 Padua Sufia Rahman High School (1966).
Colleges: 

 Chauddagram Government College
 Chauddagram Government Technical School And College
 Al Haj Noor Mia University College
 Cheora Government College

See also
Upazilas of Bangladesh
Districts of Bangladesh
Divisions of Bangladesh

References

 
Upazilas of Comilla District